W Carroll Group is a Liverpool-based waste management and construction group composed of the W Carroll & Sons Ltd, Carroll Waste Ltd and Carroll Properties companies. The group employs around 90 people and has a total turnover of over £7 million. In 2014, W Carroll & Sons Ltd were fined £105,000 and ordered to pay legal costs of £64,600 after admitting breaking the Health and Safety at Work Act in an accident in which a worker was paralysed in a fall from a ladder in Southport. In November 2014 the firm won a new contract for roofing work with West Lancashire Council.

The firm is one of the sponsors of the Cammell Laird 1907 Football Club.

References

Waste management companies of the United Kingdom
Construction and civil engineering companies of the United Kingdom
Companies based in Liverpool